George Herbert Barlow (January 4, 1921 – March 4, 1979) was a United States district judge of the United States District Court for the District of New Jersey.

Education and career

Born in Trenton, New Jersey, Barlow received a Bachelor of Arts degree from Dartmouth College in 1943 and a Bachelor of Laws from Rutgers Law School in 1948. He was in the United States Navy from 1943 to 1945. He was an assistant counsel for the New Jersey State Law Revision Commission from 1948 to 1953. He was in private practice in Trenton from 1948 to 1953. He was an Assistant United States Attorney of the District of New Jersey from 1953 to 1956 and then a United States Commissioner of the United States District Court for the District of New Jersey from 1956 to 1963. He then returned to private practice until 1963. He was a judge on the Mercer County Court, New Jersey from 1963 to 1966, and on the Superior Court of New Jersey from 1966 to 1970.

Federal judicial service

On July 22, 1969, Barlow was nominated by President Richard Nixon to a seat on the United States District Court for the District of New Jersey vacated by Judge Arthur Stephen Lane. Barlow was confirmed by the United States Senate on December 17, 1969, and received his commission the following day. He served as Chief Judge from 1978 until his death of an apparent heart attack on March 4, 1979, at the Mercer Medical Center in Trenton.

References

Sources
 

1921 births
1979 deaths
Dartmouth College alumni
Rutgers University alumni
Judges of the United States District Court for the District of New Jersey
United States district court judges appointed by Richard Nixon
20th-century American judges
New Jersey state court judges
United States Navy personnel of World War II
20th-century American lawyers
Assistant United States Attorneys